Zwicky's Triplet (Arp 103) is a group of three galaxies visible in the constellation Hercules.

The other Zwicky's Triplet 
IC 3481 at 12h 32m, +11° 24' (2000.0) in Virgo, which is connected to PGC 41646 ("IC 3481A") as the system Arp 175, but probably not connected to IC 3483, is sometimes called Zwicky's Triplet, but this name is more often applied to the system at 16h 49m, +45° 30' (2000.0) in Hercules.

See also
 Wild's Triplet
 Robert's Quartet
 Stephan's Quintet
 NGC 7331 Group (also known as the Deer Lick Group, about half a degree northeast of Stephan's Quintet)
 Seyfert's Sextet
 Copeland Septet

References

Hercules (constellation)
Galaxy clusters